Brigitte Mira (20 April 1910 – 8 March 2005) was a German actress. She worked in both theater and film, and on many occasions, with Rainer Werner Fassbinder.

Believed to have been born in Hamburg, she moved when young to Berlin. Mira's mother was German, and her father was Russian Jewish. During the Nazi era, Mira took part in the propaganda series Liese und Miese. She played Miese (germ. bad one): the bad role model, according to Nazi ideology, who listened to enemy radio stations and stockpiled rationed food. However, her acting skills turned the "bad" character she portrayed into a likeable one. The series was cancelled for being counterproductive. The propaganda directors did not know that Mira was half-Jewish because she had false papers. Although she insisted on her naivete as a young woman and that she had to conceal her origins, she was criticized later by some for taking part in these ads at all.

Notable performances include Emmi Kurowski in Fear Eats the Soul (1974), a role for which she won a German Film Award. In the 1980s, Mira achieved another big success with the television series Drei Damen vom Grill. She appeared in the 1991 stage production of Stephen Sondheim's Follies in Berlin.

Partial filmography 

 The Berliner (1948) as Dirne
  (1958) as Frau Mertens
 Münchhausen in Afrika (1958, voice) as Karla Mai
 When She Starts, Look Out (1958) as Frau Knax
 The Star of Santa Clara (1958) as Tante Theresa
 So ein Millionär hat's schwer (1958) as Madame Pillard
 Schlag auf Schlag (1959) as Sophie Hinze
 Melodie und Rhythmus (1959) as Pensionsleiterin
 Du bist wunderbar (1959) as Madame Dupont
 Im Namen einer Mutter (1960) as Mutter Reitner, Strafgefangene
 Geschminkte Jugend (1960)
 Ich kann nicht länger schweigen (1962) as Frau Ohl
 So toll wie anno dazumal (1962) as Frau Sommer
 Jack and Jenny (1963) as Thea
  (1968) as Frau Bütow
 Hotel by the Hour (1970) as Rose Schuh
 Twenty Girls and the Teachers (1971) as Wirtin
 Wir hau'n den Hauswirt in die Pfanne (1971) as Mutti Bauer
 Eight Hours Don't Make a Day (1973, TV series, directed by Rainer Werner Fassbinder) as Marions Mutter, Frau Andreas
 The Tenderness of Wolves (1973, directed by Ulli Lommel) as Louise Engel
 1 Berlin-Harlem (1974)
 Ali: Fear Eats the Soul (1974, directed by Rainer Werner Fassbinder) as Emmi
 The Enigma of Kaspar Hauser (1974, directed by Werner Herzog) as Kathe, Servant
 Fox and His Friends (1975, directed by Rainer Werner Fassbinder) as Shopkeeper #2
 Mother Küsters Goes to Heaven (1975, directed by Rainer Werner Fassbinder) as Emma Küsters
  (1975, TV film, directed by Rainer Werner Fassbinder) as Mutter
 The Secret Carrier (1975)
 Everyone Dies Alone (1976) as Frau Häberle
  (1976) as Oma Wuttke
 Satan's Brew (1976, directed by Rainer Werner Fassbinder) as Mutter Kranz
 Chinese Roulette (1976, directed by Rainer Werner Fassbinder) as Kast
 Adolf & Marlene (1977)
 Liebe das Leben, lebe das Lieben (1977) as Hauswartfrau
 Drei Damen vom Grill (1977–1992, TV series, 140 episodes) as Margarete Färber
  (1978) as Simons Mutter
 Iron Gustav (1979, TV miniseries) as Frau Pauli
 Derrick (1979, Season 6, Episode 12: "Ein Todesengel") as Frau Tobbe
 Primel macht ihr Haus verrückt (1980) as Frau Kulicke
 Fabian (1980) as Frau Hohlfeld
 Berlin Alexanderplatz (1980, TV miniseries) as Frau Bast / Wirtin Bast
 Lili Marleen (1981, directed of Rainer Werner Fassbinder) as Nachbarin
  (1981) as Denunziantin
 Kamikaze 1989 (1982) as Personaldirektorin
 The Roaring Fifties (1983) as Frau Willmsen
  (1984) as Frau Niendorf
  (1985) as Toilettenfrau
 Schwarzer Lohn und weiße Weste (1985) as Gemüsefrau
 Spreepiraten (1989–1990, TV series, 21 episodes) as Gundula Brachvogel
 Fassbinder's Women (2000, documentary by Rosa von Praunheim) as Herself

Dubbing roles
Widow Tweed - Disney's The Fox and the Hound (1981)

External links 
 
 Brigitte Mira: Character actor who epitomised the spirit of old Berlin – The Guardian, 2005-03-25. Retrieved on 2010-04-21.

1910 births
2005 deaths
Actresses from Berlin
Best Actress German Film Award winners
Commanders Crosses of the Order of Merit of the Federal Republic of Germany
Recipients of the Order of Merit of Berlin
German stage actresses
German people of Russian-Jewish descent
German film actresses
German television actresses
20th-century German actresses